The 2009–10 season was Aston Villa's 135th professional season; their 99th season in the top-flight and their 22nd consecutive season in the top flight of English football, the Premier League. They were managed by Martin O'Neill – in his fourth season since replacing David O'Leary. The 2009–10 season was Villa's second consecutive spell in European competition for the club, and the first in the newly formatted UEFA Europa League.

This term marked the first for the club without long-term player and former captain Gareth Barry following his £12million move to Manchester City on 2 June 2009. Barry had been at the club since 1997.

The Birmingham Derby made a return to the Premier League after local rivals Birmingham City were promoted to the top tier. Villa won the first of two fixtures 1–0 at St Andrew's on 13 September 2009 with Gabriel Agbonlahor scoring the winning goal. Villa also won the return fixture at Villa Park 1–0 on 25 April 2010, thanks to a James Milner penalty. Villa also played games against newly promoted Wolves from nearby Wolverhampton, resulting in a 1–1 draw at Molineux and a 2–2 draw at Villa Park.

The club progressed to the final of the League Cup during this season, eliminating Cardiff City, Sunderland, Portsmouth and Blackburn Rovers along the way. However, Aston Villa were beaten 2–1 by Manchester United in the final at Wembley Stadium on 28 February 2010. Villa's other domestic cup venture also took the club to Wembley in the FA Cup, where they were defeated 3–0 by Chelsea in the semi-final. Aston Villa finished 6th in the Premier League for the 3rd year in a row, with 2 points more than previous season, they also qualified for the Europa League for the 3rd year running.

First team squad

Left club during season 

(on loan to Newcastle United)
(on loan to Nottingham Forest and Fulham)
(to Birmingham City)
(on loan to Middlesbrough)
(on loan to Lincoln City and Leyton Orient)

 (on loan to Plymouth and Leeds United)
(on loan to Blackpool)
(on loan to Lincoln City)
(on loan to Lincoln City)
(on loan to Darlington)

Reserve squad

Transfers

Transfers in

Transfers out

Loan out

Kit changes 
The club once again dismissed sponsorship payments to allow Acorns as a charitable sponsor. A new away kit was unveiled on 24 May 2009 and inspired by the England national football team. It features a white and gray halved style with pinstripes and a navy accent, intended to pay tribute to the 67 Villa players that have appeared for the country while at the club. The blue and black away kit of 2008–09 also became this season's third kit.
The new home kit was unveiled the day before the first clash of the Peace Cup 2009, which was against Málaga on Saturday 25 July.

Premier League

Final league position

Results

Results by matchday

Cup matches

FA Cup

League Cup

UEFA Europa League

Friendly matches

Peace Cup

Goalscorers

Appearances

See also 
 2009–10 in English football
 List of Aston Villa F.C. seasons

References 

2009-10
2009–10 Premier League by team